James Brown (May 14, 1919 – death date unknown) was an American baseball left fielder and pitcher in the Negro leagues. He played with the Newark Eagles from 1939 to 1943 and the Indianapolis–Cincinnati Clowns in 1947.

References

External links
 and Seamheads

Indianapolis Clowns players
Newark Eagles players
1919 births
Year of death missing
Baseball players from North Carolina
Baseball pitchers
Baseball outfielders